Who Said That? is a 1948–55 NBC game show that ran on radio and television, in which a panel of celebrities attempted to determine the speaker of a quotation from recent news reports.

References

External links
Who Said That? at IMDB
Video of public domain episode at Internet Archive

1940s American radio programs
1948 American television series debuts
1955 American television series endings
American panel games
American radio game shows
1940s American game shows
1950s American game shows
NBC original programming
American Broadcasting Company original programming
Black-and-white American television shows
English-language television shows
Television shows set in New York City
NBC radio programs
1950s British game shows